Esteban Muñoz Nogales (born 27 December 1984) is a Spanish professional footballer who plays as a centre back.

Club career
Born in Palma de Mallorca, Balearic Islands, Muñoz joined the youth academy of UD San Pedro at the age of 16. Two years later, he switched to CD Ferriolense and made his senior debut against a subsidiary team of RCD Mallorca. In 2007, he signed with UD Los Palacios which competed in Tercera División. However, without making any appearance he returned to Balearic Islands and joined CD Atlético Baleares and helped in promotion to Segunda División B in his first season with the club.

Ahead of the 2010–11 season, Muñoz moved to CE Constància. On 26 July 2012, his contract was extended by one year. On 12 July 2013, he rejoined CD Atlético Baleares in the third tier. After collecting more than 100 caps for the side, he left the club on 28 June 2017.

On 26 July 2017, Muñoz moved to fellow league club UE Llagostera. On 16 June 2018, he switched to CF Villanovense but left the side by mutual consent at the end of the season.

On 22 January 2019, Muñoz moved abroad and joined Greek Football League club Iraklis.

References

External links

1984 births
Living people
Spanish footballers
Association football defenders
Segunda División B players
Tercera División players
Football League (Greece) players
III liga players
CD Atlético Baleares footballers
CE Constància players
UE Costa Brava players
CF Villanovense players
Iraklis Thessaloniki F.C. players
Elana Toruń players
Spanish expatriate footballers
Expatriate footballers in Greece
Expatriate footballers in Poland
Spanish expatriate sportspeople in Greece
Spanish expatriate sportspeople in Poland
CD Olímpic de Xàtiva footballers